Genc Tomorri (born 17 January 1960) is an Albanian football director, coach and former player, who has been associated with Partizani Tirana throughout his playing and coaching career.

International career
He made his debut for Albania in a November 1983 European Championship qualification 2-1 loss away against West Germany in which he scored the opening goal and was sent off in the early minutes of the second half. It proved to remain his sole international game.

Honours
Albanian Superliga: 2
 1981, 1987

References

External links

1960 births
Living people
Footballers from Tirana
Albanian footballers
Association football defenders
Albania international footballers
Albania under-21 international footballers
FK Partizani Tirana players
Albanian football managers
FK Partizani Tirana managers
Kategoria Superiore players
Kategoria Superiore managers